The Forum for the National Unity of Abkhazia (FNUA; ;) is a prominent oppositional political party in Abkhazia. It is led by former President Raul Khajimba (also the former Prime Minister and former Vice President).

History

The FNUA was founded on 8 February 2005 to unite 12 opposition parties, socio-political movements, public organisations and youth organisations, which however continued to exist as individual entities. It mainly brought together supporters of Raul Khajimba in the October 2004 presidential election. Khajimba had lost that election, but became Vice President following the power-sharing agreement concluded to end the post-election crisis, and the FNUA considered ensuring the strict implementation of that agreement one of its principal tasks. The FNUA was initially governed by a coordinating board of twelve members, headed by Gennadi Alamia, co-chairman of the Social-Democratic Party of Abkhazia.

The FNUA became a socio-political movement on 10 October 2005 and Avtandil Gartskia, Vitali Gabnia and Daur Arshba were elected its co-chairmen. On 6 March 2008 the FNUA was transformed into a political party and Daur Arshba and Astamur Tania became its two co-chairmen.

In the run-up to the 12 December 2009 Presidential election, the FNUA intended to nominate Raul Khajimba and Zaur Ardzinba, but in the end the pair could not agree on who would get what position, and the congress of the FNUA, planned for 29 October, was called off. Khajimba and Ardzinba then entered the election separately, ending up 2nd and 3rd respectively, behind incumbent President Sergei Bagapsh.

On 12 May 2010, the FNUA held a congress during which the number of Chairmen was reduced from 2 to 1, and the number of Deputy Chairmen from 4 to 2. Raul Khajimba was elected to the new leadership position, with Daur Arshba and Rita Lolua becoming his deputies.

On 10 July 2013, the Forum signed a cooperation agreement with fellow opposition parties United Abkhazia, the People's Party of Abkhazia and the Party for the Economic Development of Abkhazia, and with a number of social movements.

On 31 March 2015, Daur Arshba again succeeded Khajimba as Chairman.

On 2 March 2016, the FNUA condemned the planned referendum to hold an early presidential election. After the referendum had been approved by President Khajimba, the party held a congress on 10 June in the hall of the hotel Inter-Sukhum, attended by 356 delegates, during which various speakers called for a boycott of the referendum.

Original composition

The Forum for the National Unity of Abkhazia originally brought together three political parties:

 the People's Party of Abkhazia
 the Social-Democratic Party of Abkhazia
 the Republican Party of Abkhazia

one socio-political movement:

 Aidgylara
six public organisations and movements:
 Aiaaira
 Akhatsa
 the Union of Defenders of Abkhazia
 Rodina
 Apsadgil
 the Abkhazian branch of the LDPR

and two youth organisations:

 Smena
 the Social-Democratic Youth of Abkhazia

Election results

Presidential

Parliamentary

References

2005 establishments in Abkhazia
Political parties established in 2005
Political parties in Abkhazia
Nationalist parties
Russophilia